Tol Rigi (also Romanized as Tol Rīgī) is a village in Jolgah Rural District, in the Central District of Jahrom County, Fars Province, Iran. At the 2006 census, its population was 1,150, in 235 families.

References 

Populated places in Jahrom County